The 1896 Columbian Orange and Blue football team was an American football team that represented Columbian University (now known as George Washington University) as an independent during the 1896 college football season. In first second season under head coach Graham Nichols, the team compiled a 2–1 record.

Schedule

References

Columbian
George Washington Colonials football seasons
Columbian Orange and Blue football